Zelenyi Pid is a village in Kakhovka Raion, Kherson Oblast, Ukraine. The village hosts the administration of the Zelenyi Pid rural hromada, one of the hromadas of Ukraine.

Geography 
The village is situated 90 km east of the administrative centre of the Oblast, Kherson, and 32km south-east of the administrative centre of the raion, Nova Kakhovka. It has an area of 1.2 km2 and a population of approximately 922 people.

Russian invasion and occupation 
When Russia invaded Ukraine, most of Kherson Oblast, along with the village of Zelenyi Pid, were captured on the first day of the war, 24 February 2022. On 10 and 11 November 2022, all settlements west of the Dnieper, including the city of Kherson, were liberated by the Ukrainian Armed Forces. However, as of February 2023, the village remains occupied by Russian forces.

References 

Villages in Kakhovka Raion